Peter Teicher (born 24 May 1944) is a German water polo player. He competed at the 1968 Summer Olympics and the 1972 Summer Olympics.

References

1944 births
Living people
German male water polo players
Olympic water polo players of West Germany
Water polo players at the 1968 Summer Olympics
Water polo players at the 1972 Summer Olympics
Sportspeople from Stuttgart